The 2015 South American Junior Rugby Championship (Sudamérica Rugby (CONSUR) Championship) Division A is the second edition of the newly formatted South American Junior Rugby Championship for Under 19 national teams. It was held in Asunción from August 9 to August 15. The top 4 nations of South America play the tournament. The winner will play for the Junior CONSUR Cup against Argentina.

The tournament serves as CONSUR's qualifier for the 2016 World Rugby Under 20 Trophy to be held in Zimbabwe.

Standings

Matches

First round

Second round

Third round

Awards
Felipe Etcheverry from Uruguay was chosen as the best player of the tournament.

Sudamérica Junior Rugby Cup
The second edition was played on 10 October in Rosario, between the past champions Argentina against the 2015 South American Junior Rugby Championship "A" champions Uruguay.

See also
 South American Junior Rugby Championship

References

External links
Sudamérica Rugby Official Webpage 

South American Junior Rugby Championship
Rugby Championship
August 2015 sports events in South America
Sports competitions in Asunción
2010s in Asunción